Frank "Frankie Loc" LoCascio (September 24, 1932 – October 1, 2021) was an American mobster in New York who became the Consigliere to the Gambino crime family boss John Gotti.

Biography
LoCascio was born to Italian immigrants from Baucina, Sicily. 

Becoming a made man during the 1950s, LoCascio was a bookmaker and loanshark for the Gambino family. Later on, he was promoted to caporegime of a crew in the Bronx, New York. After the December 1985 assassination of boss Paul Castellano, Gotti became the new Gambino boss and LoCascio joined his inner circle. When underboss Joseph Armone went to prison in 1987, LoCascio became acting underboss; When Gotti reshuffled his administration later on, promoting Salvatore "Sammy the Bull" Gravano to Armone's position, LoCascio became acting consigliere.

1992 conviction
On December 11, 1990, LoCascio was arrested alongside Gotti and Gravano and indicted for racketeering. At the time of his arrest, LoCascio was still publicly identified as the Gambino family's underboss.

At this time, Gravano decided to become a government witness and testified against his former associates. On April 2, 1992, LoCascio was convicted on racketeering and conspiracy charges, as was Gotti. On June 23, 1992, both Gotti and LoCascio were sentenced to life imprisonment without the possibility of parole. When asked to comment at his sentencing, LoCascio made the following remarks:

"First, I would like to say emphatically that I am innocent... I am guilty though. I am guilty of being a good friend of John Gotti. And if there were more men like John Gotti on this earth, we would have a better country." 

Gambino captain Joseph "Jo Jo" Corozzo later replaced LoCascio as consigliere. As of December 2011, LoCascio was imprisoned at the Federal Medical Center Devens in Massachusetts. He had no projected release date.

In Underboss, the tell-all tome by Salvatore "Sammy the Bull" Gravano, describes an incident in which LoCascio, in jail with Gotti and Gravano in 1991, gave him a stolen orange before offering one to Gotti. Gotti became furious and loudly belittled LoCascio in front of other inmates. Later, Gravano said, a humiliated LoCascio tearfully vowed to murder Gotti, stating, "The minute I get out, I'm killing this [expletive]." Gravano claims he and LoCascio then made a pact to kill Gotti at a victory party, assuming they were somehow acquitted: "Frankie said, 'Sammy, two things. I'll bring him to the party myself, and I got to be the shooter.'"

According to law enforcement sources and court papers, an infuriated Gotti, who was serving a life sentence in Marion, Illinois, reached out to the Aryan Brotherhood prison gang to kill LoCascio. Sources said they believe that two members of the white supremacist group were used in 1994 by one of Gotti's associates in a murder-for-hire contract. At some point, federal prison officials in Marion allegedly caught Gotti complaining about the LoCascio passage on video cameras, a source said. Without identifying Gotti, prison officials said in court papers "a possible 'contract' has been put on LoCascio's life by his former Mafia associates."

Death
LoCascio tested positive for COVID-19 at the Federal Medical Center, Devens, where he had been in custody since March 22, 2001, on December 28, 2020. Following the completion of medical isolation, and after presenting with no symptoms, he was converted to a status of recovered in accordance with Centers for Disease Control and Prevention guidelines on January 8, 2021. LoCascio was placed in the comfort care program at FMC Devens on September 28, 2021, for multiple medical complications. He died in prison on October 1, 2021, at the age of 89.

In the 1996 television movie Gotti, LoCascio is portrayed by actor Raymond Serra.

In the 1998 two-part television movie Witness to the Mob, LoCascio is portrayed by actor/singer Frankie Valli.

Further reading
Capeci, Jerry. The Complete Idiot's Guide to the Mafia. Indianapolis: Alpha Books, 2002. 
Davis, John H. Mafia Dynasty: The Rise and Fall of the Gambino Crime Family. New York: HarperCollins, 1993. 
Jacobs, James B., Christopher Panarella and Jay Worthington. Busting the Mob: The United States Vs. Cosa Nostra. New York: NYU Press, 1994. 
Maas, Peter. Underboss: Sammy the Bull Gravano's Story of Life in the Mafia. New York: HarperCollins Publishers, 1997. 
Raab, Selwyn. Five Families: The Rise, Decline, and Resurgence of America's Most Powerful Mafia Empires. New York: St. Martin Press, 2005.

References

1932 births
2021 deaths
American gangsters of Sicilian descent
Gambino crime family
Gangsters sentenced to life imprisonment
People convicted of racketeering
Consiglieri
Criminals from the Bronx
Gangsters from New York City
Prisoners who died in United States federal government detention
American people who died in prison custody